Hotine Glacier is a glacier  long which is divided at its mouth by Mount Cloos, flowing west into both Deloncle Bay and Girard Bay on Kyiv Peninsula, on the west coast of Graham Land, Antarctica. It was first charted by the Belgian Antarctic Expedition under Gerlache, 1897–99, and was named by the UK Antarctic Place-Names Committee in 1959 for Brigadier Martin Hotine, Director of Overseas Surveys.

See also
Mount Matin, surmounts the mountainous divide north of Hotine Glacier

References

External links
 SCAR Composite Gazetteer of Antarctica.

Glaciers of Graham Coast